is a Japanese fashion designer who created the brand Undercover.

Early life and education
Takahashi was born in Kiryū, Gunma. He attended Gunma Kiryu Nishi High School. In 1988, he enrolled in Fashion Education at Bunka Fashion College. In his free time, he was the vocal lead for the cover band "Tokyo Sex Pistols", where his role model was Vivienne Westwood.

Career
In 1993, he launched Undercover, a high-end streetwear label for men, women and children. Also in 1993, he launched Nowhere, a retail venture in Ura-Harajuku with his friend Nigo, the founder of BAPE. In 1994–1995 he participated in Tokyo Fashion Week. In 1995 the Nowhere Ltd. company store opened in Harajuku.

Japanese designer Rei Kawakubo who created the brand Comme des Garcons, became Jun's mentor and persuaded him to come to Paris. The Paris store Colette liked his clothes so much that they asked Takahashi to present his 1998 collection "Exchange" in their store.

Undercover made its debut at Paris Fashion Week in October 2002, for Spring/Summer 2003.

Takahashi also creates activewear lines for men and women under the label Nike x Undercover Gyakusou, with the sportswear giant. Additionally, Takahashi has collaborated with Uniqlo to create Uniqlo Undercover, since 2011.

In 2021, Takahashi created artwork and an animated music video for "Creep (Very 2021 Rmx)", a remixed version of the 1992 Radiohead song "Creep". Radiohead singer Thom Yorke contributed the remix to one of Takashi's fashion shows.

Personal life 
Takahashi has a son, Rin, and daughter, Lala Takahashi, and is married to Morishita Riko, with whom he worked for the Uniqlo collaboration.

Awards and achievements 

In 1997, he received the New Face Prize in Mainichi fashion grand prize sponsored by the Mainichi national daily newspaper. In 2001, he received the Grand Prize in Mainichi fashion grand prize sponsored by the Mainichi national daily newspaper. In 2013, he received the Grand Prize in Mainichi fashion grand prize for the second time.

References

External links 
 Jun Takahashi Blog 
 Undercoverism

1969 births
Living people
Japanese fashion designers
People from Gunma Prefecture